KZMZ (96.9 FM, "96.9 Rocks") is a radio station broadcasting a classic rock format. Licensed to Alexandria, Louisiana, United States, the station serves the Alexandria area.  The station is currently owned by Cenla Broadcasting Licensing Company, LLC.  Its studios are located on Texas Avenue in Alexandria, and its transmitter is located near Forest Hill, Louisiana.

History
The station went on the air in 1947 as a sister station to KALB-AM (Now KJMJ) and KALB-TV with the call letters KALB-FM. Since the 1980s, 96.9 has been programmed as an urban station with the callsign of KTIZ, and top 40, classic rock, and mainstream rock formats as KZMZ.

Sports
KZMZ, as of 2008, is a sister station to KSYL and broadcasts LSU Tigers football games . It also broadcasts the football games of the Bolton Bears, a local high school football team.

References

External links

Radio stations in Louisiana
Classic rock radio stations in the United States
Radio stations established in 1947
1947 establishments in Louisiana